Buenos Aires Sings (Spanish:Buenos Aires canta) is a 1947 Argentine musical film directed by Antonio Solano and starring Niní Marshall, Hugo del Carril and Azucena Maizani. The film is part of the tradition of tango films.

Cast
 Niní Marshall 
 Hugo del Carril
 Azucena Maizani
 Homero Cárpena
 Oscar Alemán
 Oscar Alonso
 Los Lecuona Cuban Boys
 Lilia Bedrune
 Los Mills Brothers
 Chola Luna
 Ernesto Famá
 Francisco Amor

References

Bibliography
 Etchelet, Raúl. Niní Marshall: (la biografía).  La Crujía Ediciones, 2005.

External links
 

1947 films
1947 musical films
Argentine musical films
1940s Spanish-language films
Argentine black-and-white films
Films set in Buenos Aires
1940s Argentine films